Junagadh district is a district of the Indian state of Gujarat. Its administrative headquarters is the city of Junagadh.

Geography
The district is located on the Kathiawar peninsula in western Gujarat. It is surrounded by Rajkot District (North), Porbandar District (North-West), Amreli District (East). To the South and West is the Arabian Sea.

Porbandar, was earlier a part of this district, before the Porbandar district was carved out of Junagadh district.

Junagadh has a mountain range called Girnar which is a place of pilgrimage for Hinduism and Jainism.

Divisions
Talukas of Junagadh are: Junagadh City, Bhesan subdistrict, Junagadh Rural, Keshod, Malia, Manavadar, Mangrol, Mendarda, Vanthali, Visavadar.

Transportation

Junagadh is well connected by road and railway networks. It is about 100 km from Rajkot and 350 km from Ahmedabad. National highway 8D connects Junagadh to Rajkot via Jetpur.

Junagadh railway station is also well connected with Rajkot, Ahmedabad. It is in the city area. Junagadh also has an airport at Keshod which has limited connectivity with Mumbai.

The district has a long shore line and has ports like Veraval, Mangrol, Chorwad etc. But it has limited usages other than fisheries industry.

As of October 2011, the government of India has given its approval for a rope way on Mount and in 2021 it got completed and was inaugurated by Prime minister Narendra Modi . In the past helicopter service was available for Mount Girnar but it is now discontinued.

Demographics

According to the 2011 census Junagadh district has a population of 2,743,082, roughly equal to the nation of Jamaica or the US state of Utah. This gives it a ranking of 142nd in India (out of a total of 640). Its population growth rate over the decade 2001–2011 was 12.01%. Junagadh has a sex ratio of 952 females for every 1000 males. It had a literacy rate of 67.7% in 2001 which increased to a literacy rate of 76.88% in 2011.

The divided district has a population of 1,525,605, of which 573,403 (37.59%) lived in urban areas. Junagadh had a sex ratio of 945 females per 1000 males. Scheduled Castes and Scheduled Tribes are 151,971 (9.96%) and 37,810 (2.48%) of the population respectively.

Hindus are 1,348,315 (88.38%) and Muslims 170,338 (11.17%) of the population respectively.

Gujarati was the predominant language, spoken by 97.44% of the population.

Politics
  

|}

Notable personalities
 Narsinh Mehta (1414?–1481?), poet-saint, born in Talaja, Bhavnagar.
Putlibai Gandhi - mother of Mahatma Gandhi

 Keshubhai Patel (1928–2020), politician who served as Chief Minister of Gujarat, was born in Visavadar in Junagadh
 Wazir Mohammad (1929–), cricketer, born at Junagadh, later settled in Pakistan
 Dhirubhai Ambani (1932–2002), business magnate and entrepreneur, born at Chorwad, Junagadh
 Hanif Mohammad (1934–2016), cricketer, born at Junagadh, settled in Pakistan after 1947
 Rajendra Shukla (1942–), poet, born at Bantwa, Junagadh
 Mushtaq Mohammad (1943–), cricketer, born at Junagadh, later settled in Pakistan
 Sadiq Mohammad (1945–), cricketer, born at Junagadh, later settled in Pakistan
 Parveen Babi (1949–2005), Bollywood actress, born at Junagadh
 Nawab Muhammad Mahabat Khan

Flora and fauna
Junagadh contains the Gir Forest National Park, which is the only home to Asiatic lions. Mount Girnar is also declared a forest reserve for Bamboos. "Girnari Giddh", the long-billed vultures, are found only on Girnar, as the Girnar region alone accounts for about 25 per cent of the species and about 10 per cent of the total vulture population in the Gujarat State.

Education 
Junagadh Agricultural University is majorly famous here. Other educational institutes include:
 N R Vekaria Institutes of Business Management Studies
 Amrut Institute, Junagadh
 http://www.bknmu.edu.in/

References

External links

 Official website
Junagadh Collectorate official website
Junagadh Jilla Panchayat official website

 
Districts of Gujarat